John Joyce or Johnny Joyce may refer to:

 John Joyce (New Zealand politician) (1839–1899), New Zealand Member of Parliament (MP)
 John Joyce (American politician) (born 1957), United States Representative
 John Joye or Joyce, MP
 Jack Joyce (John Edward Joyce, 1876–1934), American horseman & performer
 John Joyce (footballer) (1877–1956), English footballer 
 John Joe Joyce (born 1987), Irish boxer
 John Joyce (musician) (1933–2004), British folk musician
 Johnny Joyce (Gaelic footballer) (1937–2019), Irish Gaelic footballer
 John Stanislaus Joyce (1849–1931), father of James Joyce
 John Joyce (cricketer) (1868–1938), English cricketer
 Johnny Joyce (athlete) (1878–1957), American track and field athlete
 John A. Joyce (1842–1915), American military officer, poet and writer
 John T. Joyce (1894–1930), American businessman and politician
 John Joyce (actor) (1939–2009)

See also
 John Joyce Russell (1897–1993), American prelate
 John Joyce Gilligan (1921–2013), American politician
 Robert John Hayman-Joyce, British soldier, see Robert Hayman-Joyce
 Joice (name)